Mike Dunleavy is the name of:
 Mike Dunleavy Sr. (born 1954), American former basketball coach, executive, and player
 Mike Dunleavy Jr. (born 1980), American basketball executive and former player
 Mike Dunleavy (politician) (born 1961), American educator and politician, current Governor of Alaska